The National School of Drama, New Delhi, has established its camp office National School of Drama Theatre-in-Education Wing Tripura in conjunction with the Department of Information & Cultural Affairs and Higher Education, Government of Tripura, in Agartala, with effect from November 17, 2011. The wing provides a one-year residential PG certificate course in Theatre-in-Education to students from the Northeast, the rest of India, and around the world.

Course 
The wing only accepts students from India for a one-year residential certificate study in Theatre-in-Education. The programme is designed to prepare theatre teachers for schools, artists for TIE activities, and TIE resource people to train children and teachers using TIE methodology.

Plays Curated 

 Tede Mede Qisse

 In Your Hands
 In The Name of an Unborn Baby
 Laxman Ka Haktishel
 Par Hume Khelna Hai
 Toofan Mail Dragon Tale
 Pathorer Poth Stony Path
 Bhago Bhuttu Aayaa

Festivals 
 Poorvottar Natya Samaroh
 Poorvottar Rang Utsav
 Bharat Rang Mahotsav
 Poorvottar Rashtriya Rang Utsav
 Bal Sangam

Notable faculty 

 Dr. Jyostna Tiwari, Art in Education

 Vijay Kumar Singh, Theatre in Education
 Radha Ramaswamy, Theatre of the oppressed
 Maya Rao (TIR), Drama in Education
 Lewis Frost (UK), Drama in Education
 Walter Peter, Drama in Education
 Moloyashree Hasmi, Drama in Education
 Suwarn Rawat, Drama in Education
 Ashwath Bhatt, Clowning
 Sukhmani Kohli, Clowning
 Hailey Jones (USA), Clowning
 Shriranga Godbole, Grips Theatre
 Jyoti Bose, Grips Theatre
 Vibhawari Deshpande, Grips Theatre
 Aloy Deb Barma, Martial Arts/Acrobatics & Film study
 Thawai Thiyam, Production Process
 Mr. Ibomcha, Production Process
 Aruna Kumar Malik, Property/Mask Making
 Shiv Prasad Gound, Property/Mask Making
 N.Jadumani Singh, Handling Materials
 Anurupa Roy, Puppet Making & Handling Dadi Pudumjee
 Carol Sterling (USA), Puppet Making & Handling Dadi Pudumjee
 Deepan Sivaraman, Scenography
 Moinul Haque, Mime
 Manoj Nayar, Mime
 Anjala Maharishi, Classical Drama & Acting
 Himanshu Joshi, Light Design
 Babita Pandey, Play reading/Scenic Design & Costume Design
 D.R.Ankur, History of World Drama
 Kriti Jain, History of Indian Drama
 S.B.Kulkarni, Yoga
 Sajjad Khan, Voice & Speech
 Vijay Acharjee, Magic
 Mushimaru Fujieda (Japan), Butoh/Dance

Notable alumni 

 Vinod Saroj
 Leishangthem Tonthoingambi Devi

See also 

 Education in India
 Education in Tripura
 Tripura State Academy of Tribal Culture
 Tribal Research and Cultural Institute
 National School of Drama

References

External links 

 Official NSD TRIPURA (National School of Drama, Tripura) website
 Official TIE WING TRIPURA (TIE-WINGS-TRIPURA) website

National School of Drama
Drama schools in India
Film schools in India
Arts organizations established in 2011
Educational institutions established in 2011
Performing arts education in India
Theatre in India
Universities and colleges in Tripura
Colleges in Tripura